The Europe/Africa Zone was one of the three zones of the regional Davis Cup competition in 1997.

In the Europe/Africa Zone there were four different tiers, called groups, in which teams competed against each other to advance to the upper tier. The top two teams in Group III advanced to the Europe/Africa Zone Group II in 1998, whereas the bottom two teams were relegated to the Europe/Africa Zone Group IV in 1998.

Participating nations

Draw
 Venue: Dakar Olympic Club, Dakar, Senegal
 Date: 22–26 January

Group A

Group B

1st to 4th place play-offs

5th to 8th place play-offs

Final standings

  and  promoted to Group II in 1998.
  and  relegated to Group IV in 1998.

Round robin

Group A

Ethiopia vs. Turkey

Macedonia vs. San Marino

Ethiopia vs. Macedonia

San Marino vs. Turkey

Ethiopia vs. San Marino

Macedonia vs. Turkey

Group B

Senegal vs. Armenia

Bosnia and Herzegovina vs. Luxembourg

Senegal vs. Bosnia and Herzegovina

Armenia vs. Luxembourg

Senegal vs. Luxembourg

Armenia vs. Bosnia and Herzegovina

1st to 4th place play-offs

Semifinals

Senegal vs. Turkey

Macedonia vs. Luxembourg

Final

Senegal vs. Luxembourg

3rd to 4th play-off

Turkey vs. Macedonia

5th to 8th place play-offs

5th to 8th play-offs

San Marino vs. Armenia

Bosnia and Herzegovina vs. Ethiopia

5th to 6th play-off

San Marino vs. Bosnia and Herzegovina

7th to 8th play-off

Armenia vs. Ethiopia

References

External links
Davis Cup official website

Davis Cup Europe/Africa Zone
Europe Africa Zone Group III